Alejandro Gaviria Uribe (born 25 June 1965) is a Colombian economist and engineer, serving as the Minister of National Education of Colombia since 7 August 2022, replacing María Victoria Angulo. He also served as Minister of Health and Social Protection of Colombia from 2012 to 2018. He is the former Rector of the University of Los Andes (Colombia), where he served from 2019 to August of 2021. He was Dean of the School of Economics at University of los Andes in 2006, until his appointment as Minister in 2012. Prior to his academic career, Gaviria served as Deputy Director of the National Planning Department of Colombia, as well as Deputy Director of the Foundation for the Higher Education and Development (Fedesarrollo), a private non-profit policy research centre, and as a Researcher at the Inter-American Development Bank. A published author of several books and scientific articles in peer-reviewed journals, in 2019 he was appointed Rector of University of the Andes for a four-year period.

Career

Minister of Health and Social Protection
On 30 August 2012 President Juan Manuel Santos Calderón announced the designation of Gaviria as Minister of Health and Social Protection of Colombia. Gaviria was sworn in on 3 September 2012 succeeding Beatriz Londoño Soto. On 7 August 2018, he was succeeded by the medical doctor and surgeon Juan Pablo Uribe Restrepo under the government of president Iván Duque Márquez.

Personal life
Gaviria was born in 1966 in Santiago, Chile, to Juan Felipe Gaviria Gutiérrez and Cecilia Uribe Flórez. He is married to Carolina Soto Losada, former High Presidential Counsellor for Government, Private Sector and Competitiveness of Colombia. He has two children, Mariana Gaviria and Tomas Gaviria. On 6 September 2017, it was announced he was being treated for non-Hodgkin lymphoma. Gaviria identifies as an atheist.

Selected works

 Gaviria Uribe, Alejandro (2016). Alguien tiene que llevar la contraria. Ariel.
Gaviria Uribe, Alejandro (2018). Hoy es siempre todavía. Ariel.
Gaviria Uribe, Alejandro (2019). Siquiera tenemos las palabras. Ariel.
Gaviria Uribe, Alejandro (2020). Otro fin del mundo es posible. Ariel.
Gaviria Uribe, Alejandro (2021). En defensa del humanismo. Ariel.

References

External links

1966 births
Living people
People from Santiago
Chilean people of Colombian descent
Colombian people of Chilean descent
University of Los Andes (Colombia) alumni
University of California, San Diego alumni
Colombian civil engineers
Colombian economists
Colombian journalists
Male journalists
Academic staff of the University of Los Andes (Colombia)
Ministers of Health and Social Protection of Colombia
Colombian atheists
Chilean atheists
Cabinet of Gustavo Petro
Colombian Ministers of National Education
21st-century Colombian politicians